Richard Skog    (born 16 June 1981)   is a Norwegian strongman competitor.  Before life as strongman he was a member of the Norwegian Armed Forces.

Strongman career 

He was a part of the World's Strongest Man competition for four straight years in 2007-2010, but has yet to qualify for the finals. Skog also placed third at two World's Strongest Man Super Series events in 2008. He placed second in Norway's Strongest Viking and Viking Power Challenge in 2009.

Skog has won the Norway's Strongest Man competition twice, in 2009 and 2010, his career best wins.

Acting 

Skog played the role of Oddjob, Frank Tagliano's bodyguard, in the Netflix original series Lilyhammer.  He currently plays the role of Sturla Beinknuser/Sturla Bonecrusher in the Norwegian and English language versions of NRK1 series, Norsemen.

References

Norwegian strength athletes
Living people
1981 births